Any Old Iron is a fantasy novel by British writer Anthony Burgess, published in 1989.

The novel revolves on a modern update of the Excalibur legend. Among the historical figures fictionalised in the novel are Chaim Weizmann, A. J. Cronin, Winston Churchill, Éamon de Valera, Anthony Eden and Joseph Stalin.
 
The action centres on the progress of a Welsh-Jewish family through the tumultuous first half of the 20th century and culminates in the birth of Israel.

References

1998 British novels
Novels by Anthony Burgess
Modern Arthurian fiction
Hutchinson (publisher) books